Yaou is a town in southeastern Ivory Coast. It is a sub-prefecture of Aboisso Department in Sud-Comoé Region, Comoé District.

Yaou was a commune until March 2012, when it became one of 1126 communes nationwide that were abolished.
In 2014, the population of the sub-prefecture of Yaou was 19,004.

Villages
The three villages of the sub-prefecture of Yaou and their population in 2014 are:
 Ebikro-N'dakro  (5 374)
 Sanhoukro  (5 916)
 Yaou  (7 714)

References

Sub-prefectures of Sud-Comoé
Former communes of Ivory Coast